Antillognatha is a monotypic genus of  long-jawed orb-weavers containing the single species, Antillognatha lucida. It was first described by E. B. Bryant in 1945, and is found on Hispaniola.

See also
 List of Tetragnathidae species

References

Monotypic Araneomorphae genera
Spiders of the Caribbean
Arthropods of the Dominican Republic
Tetragnathidae